EO Sidi Bouzid is a Tunisian football club founded in 1959 in the city of Sidi Bouzid. The club is currently evolving in the Ligue 1. The name of the club comes from the names of Club Olympique de Sidi Bouzid and l'Étoile Sportive de Gammouda, two clubs that merged in 2003 to create the current EOSB.

References

External links
 Official website

 
Football clubs in Tunisia